Indian was an unincorporated community in Kanawha County, West Virginia, United States. It once had a post office  but it is now closed.

References 

Unincorporated communities in West Virginia
Unincorporated communities in Kanawha County, West Virginia